Clapp House may refer to:

L.W. Clapp House, Wichita, Kansas, listed on the National Register of Historic Places (NRHP)
R.D.W. Clapp House, Wichita, Kansas, listed on the NRHP
Charles Q. Clapp House, Portland, Maine
Clapp Houses, Boston, Massachusetts
William Clapp House, Dorchester, Massachusetts
George Clapp House, Grafton, Massachusetts
Leverett and Amanda Clapp House, Centreville, Michigan
Silas Clapp House, West Warwick, Rhode Island